Araguaína Futebol e Regatas, usually known simply as Araguaína, is a Brazilian football club from Araguaína, Tocantins state. The club plays its home matches at Municipal de Araguaína. Araguaína competed in the Campeonato Brasileiro Série C in 2007, and won the Campeonato Tocantinense in 2006.

History
The club was founded on February 28, 1997, after Araguaína Esporte Clube folded in 1996. In 2006, the club won the state championship for the first time, beating Tocantinópolis in the final. In 2007, Araguaína competed in the Campeonato Brasileiro Série C for the first time, but was eliminated in the first stage, after being punished with the loss of 12 points after fielding in two matches an ineligible player, named Eucimar da Silva Santos.

Season records

Notes: 112th match not played2Araguaína lost 12 points for fielding an ineligible player (Eucimar da Silva Santos) in two matches.

Achievements
Campeonato Tocantinense: 2
2006, 2009

Stadium
Araguaína's home stadium is Municipal de Araguaína, officially named Estádio Municipal George Yunes, with a maximum capacity of 3,000 people.

Current squad

References

External links
 Araguaina Futebol e Regatas at Arquivo de Clubes

 
Association football clubs established in 1997
Football clubs in Tocantins
1997 establishments in Brazil